Reynold Nelson Hoover (born May 2, 1961) is a retired lieutenant general in the United States Army, who served as the deputy commander of the United States Northern Command.

Education
Hoover is a 1983 graduate of the United States Military Academy. He later earned an M.A. in Public-Private Management from Birmingham–Southern College, a J.D. from the Columbus School of Law and a Master of Strategic Studies degree from the United States Army War College.

Awards and decorations

References

1961 births
Living people
United States Military Academy alumni
Birmingham–Southern College alumni
Columbus School of Law alumni
United States Army War College alumni
United States Army generals